AEO may refer to:

 Authorized economic operator, a WCO standard to secure and facilitate global trade
 American Eagle Outfitters, an American clothing and accessories retailer 
 Appearance event ordination, a dating system for land mammal fossils
 Alternative episcopal oversight, ecclesiastical systems through which certain churches are provided with a different bishop
 Adaptive Execution Office of DARPA (US military)
 Aioun el Atrouss Airport (IATA airport code: AEO) in Mauritania

See also
 AO (disambiguation)
 EO (disambiguation)
 Aeos (disambiguation)
 AOE (disambiguation)